Richardsen is a surname. Notable people with the surname include:

 Philipp Richardsen (born 1976), Austrian musician
 Oddvar Richardsen (1937–1997), Norwegian footballer and manager
 Rune Richardsen (born 1962), Norwegian footballer

See also
 Richardson (surname)

Surnames from given names